Powers may refer to:

Arts and media
 Powers (comics), a comic book series by Brian Michael Bendis and Michael Avon Oeming
 Powers (American TV series), a 2015–2016 series based on the comics
 Powers (British TV series), a 2004 children's science-fiction series
 Powers (duo), an American pop group
 Powers (novel), an Annals of the Western Shore novel by Ursula K. Le Guin
 Powers: A Study in Metaphysics, a 2003 book by George Molnar 
 Powers, a 2019 album by the Futureheads

Businesses and organizations
 Powers (whiskey), a brand of Irish whiskey
 Powers Dry Goods, an American department store chain
 Powers Motion Picture Company, an American film company
 Powers Motorsports, an American racing team

Places in the United States

Cities and communities
 Powers, Indiana
 Powers, Michigan
 Powers, Oregon
 Powers Coal Camp, Kentucky
 Powers Lake, North Dakota
 Powers Lake, Wisconsin
 Powers Park, Georgia
 Powers Township, Minnesota

Historic sites
 Powers Auditorium, in Youngstown, Ohio
 Powers Building, an office building in Rochester, New York
 Powers Church, a church in York Township, Indiana
 Powers Home, a house in Troy, New York
 Powers Hotel (disambiguation), two hotels
 Powers House (disambiguation), several houses
 Powers Institute Historic District, in Bernardston, Massachusetts

Natural features
 Powers Bluff, Wisconsin
 Powers Caldera, Hawaii
 Powers Creek, Missouri
 Powers Lake (Georgia)
 Powers Lake (Minnesota)

Parks
 Powers Field, a ballpark in Cheyenne, Wyoming
 Powers Marine Park, a park in Portland, Oregon

Schools
 Powers Catholic High School, Flint, Michigan, US
 Powers High School, Powers, Oregon, US
 Powers Music School, Belmont, Massachusetts, US

Transportation
 Powers Ferry, on the Chattahoochee River in Marietta, Georgia
 Powers Highway, or Oregon Route 542, in Coos County, Oregon

Other uses
 Powers (angel), a rank in Christian angelology
 Powers (name), a given name and surname
 Powers Accounting Machine, an early 20th-century tabulating machine

See also
 Justice Powers (disambiguation)
 Power (disambiguation)
 The Powers Girl, a 1943 musical comedy film about aspiring models employed by John Robert Powers' modeling agency